Antarctiola is a genus of beetles in the family Carabidae, containing the following species:

 Antarctiola amaroides (Motschulsky, 1866)
 Antarctiola laevigata (Putzeys, 1875)
 Antarctiola laevis Straneo, 1951
 Antarctiola motschulskyi (Csiki, 1931)

References

Pterostichinae